Alfons Hug (born in Hochdorf, Southern West Germany) is a curator, critic and exhibition organizer.

Hug studied linguistics, comparative literature and cultural studies in Freiburg, Berlin, Dublin and Moscow.  He curated the XXV and XXVI São Paulo Art Biennial in 2002 and 2004.  Hug was the first non-Brazilian to curate this art event.

Since the mid-1980s Hug has worked as director of Goethe-Institutes (German Cultural Centres) in Lagos, Medellín, Brasília, Caracas and Moscow. From 2002-2015 he occupied this position at the Goethe-Institute in Rio de Janeiro and from July 2015-February 2016 in Singapore. From June 2016 till June 2017 he was again director of the Goethe-Institute in Lagos, Nigeria. Hug is currently director of Goethe-Zentrum in Baku.

In the 1990s Hug was head of the Visual Arts Department at "Haus der Kulturen der Welt" (House of World Cultures), Berlin.

History
2020: Curator "Invisible Biennale"
2018: Curator of the 11th Bienal do Mercosul, Porto Alegre, Brazil
2016: Curator of the 3rd Bienal de Montevideo, Uruguay
2015: Curator of the Latin American Pavilion, IILA, Venice Biennial
2014: Curator of the 2nd. Bienal of Montevideo, Uruguay
2013: Curator of the Latin American Pavilion, IILA, Venice Biennial
2013: Curator Proyecto "Trapananda", Aysén, Chile
2012: Curator of the "BRICS"-project, Kochi Biennial, India
2012: Curator of the 1st. Bienal of Montevideo, Uruguay
2011: Curator of the Latin American Pavilion, IILA, Venice Biennial
2011: Curator of the Bienal de Curitiba, Brazil
2009: Curator of the Bienal del Fin del Mundo, Ushuaia, Tierra del Fuego, Argentina
2005: Curator of Brazilian Pavilion, Venice Biennial
2005: Curator of Brazilian Representation, New Delhi Triennial
2004: Curator of Brazilian Representation, Bienal de Cuenca, Ecuador
2004: Chief Curator, 26th Bienal de São Paulo, Brazil (917,000 visitors)
2003: Organizer of "Old Art from Africa", Centro Cultural Banco do Brasil, Rio de Janeiro (750,000 visitors)
2003: Curator of Brazilian Pavilion, Venice Biennial
2003: Co-curator, 4th Bienal do Mercosul, Porto Alegre, Brazil
2002: Chief Curator, 25th Bienal de São Paulo, Brazil (670,000 visitors)

Curated also:
2022: "SILK", Giudecca Art District, Venice
2021: Oriental Heritage, Hamam in Icherisheher, Baku
2021: Haft Paykar, Kapellhaus Baku
2019: The Theft of Fire, Kapellhaus Baku
2019: A Doll's House, Kapellhaus Baku
2018: Géricault's shipwreck, Kapellhaus Baku
2017-18: Ex Africa, Centro Cultural Banco do Brasil (Belo Horizonte, Rio de Janeiro, Brasilia, São Paulo)
2017: The Atlantic Triangle, Lagos, Nigeria as well as Saracura art space in Rio de Janeiro
2017: Vanishing Voices, sound installation of Nigerian languages, Lagos
2017: Hotspot Lagos
2016: The Kula Ring, Galerie Eigenheim Weimar + Theatre Works, Singapore
2016: Jogos do Sul, Centro Helio Oiticica, Rio de Janeiro
2016: Club Berlin, Deck Artspace, Singapore
2015: Zeitgeist Berlin, CCBB Rio de Janeiro, Belo Horizonte and Brasilia
2015-16: O papagaio de Humboldt-Indigenous voices, Oi Futuro, Rio de Janeiro, Oca (São Paulo), Bienal de Curitiba, Bienal de Asuncion, Bienal de Nuevos Medios, Santiago, HAU 2 (Berlin), Hellerau Dresden, Ramallah
2014: BRICS, Oi Futuro, Rio de Janeiro (Art from Brazil, India, China, South Africa, Russia)
2013: El Aleph (Anthony Mc Call and Mischa Kuball), Faena Arts Center, Buenos Aires
2013: "Miradas insobornables", Buenos Aires
2013: O jogo só acaba quando termina - art and football (Buenos Aires, Montevideo, Brasilia, Salvador, Rio de Janeiro, São Paulo, Santiago de Chile, La Paz, Lima, Caracas, Nürnberg, Wiesbaden, Frankfurt, Berlin)
2012: "High Tech-low tech": Oi Futuro, Rio de Janeiro and Belo Horizonte
2010-2011: "Menos Tiempo que Lugar": Buenos  Aires, Córdoba, Salta, Quito, Santiago, Curitiba, Porto Alegre, Rio de Janeiro, Belo Horizonte, Medellín, La Paz, Santa Cruz de la Sierra, Lima, Guadalajara
 2009: "Arte da Antártida", Oi Futuro, Rio de Janeiro
2009-2010: "Intemperie", Ushuaia, Punta Arenas, Rosario, Montevideo, Porto Alegre, Curitiba, São Paulo, Rio de Janeiro, New York, Boston, Quito, Toulouse, Kiel, Berlin, Hong Kong, Manila
2007-2009: "The Tropics", CCBB Brasília, CCBB Rio de Janeiro, Martin-Gropius-Bau (Berlin), National Gallery (Cape Town), Jim Thompson Art Center (Bangkok)
2007: "Relíquias e Ruinas", Oi Futuro, Rio de Janeiro
2007: "Arte da China", CCBB Rio de Janeiro
2006: "Fußball: Zeichnung auf grünem Grund", CCBB Rio de Janeiro
2006: Neue brasilianische Fotokunst, Neuer Berliner Kunstverein
2005: "Alegoria barroca na arte contemporânea", CCBB, Rio de Janeiro
2004: "Carnaval", Centro Cultural Banco do Brasil, Rio de Janeiro
2000: "90x60x90-El síndrome de la Miss", Museo Jacobo Borges, Caracas
1999: Internetproject with ZKM (Karlsruhe): Philip Pocock, Roberto Cabot, W. Staehle
1999: El Retorno de Humboldt (Caracas)
1998: Biennale de Dakar, co-curator, Contemp. Korean Art, (Berlin)
1997: Painting from China (organizer), Berlin
1997: Die anderen Modernen (25 Artists from Latin America, Asia and Africa), (Berlin)
1996: Colours – South African Art (Berlin)
1995: Havanna/São Paulo-  Contemporary Art from Latin America (Berlin)
Die Rote Burg – Art from Spain and North Africa (Berlin)
Contemporary African Art (Berlin)
1994: Soundscape Brasília, various venues in Brasília
1994: Revendo Brasília, Galeria Athos Bulcão (Brasília), Museu de Imagem e Som (São Paulo), Palácio Gustavo Capanema (Rio de Janeiro), Museu Metropolitano de Arte  (Curitiba)
1984-87: 10 individual and group shows of Nigerian artists in Lagos
1992-93 : Arte Amazonas, Museu de Arte Moderna (Rio de Janeiro), Museu de Arte, (Brasília),  Kunsthalle Berlin, Ludwig Forum, Aachen

References
 

http://www.spiegel.de/spiegel/print/d-65169799.html
http://universes-in-universe.org/eng/specials/2008/tropics/
http://universes-in-universe.org/eng/bien/curitiba_biennial/2011
http://universes-in-universe.org/eng/bien/biennial_of_the_end_of_the_world/2009
http://universes-in-universe.org/eng/specials/2010/bicentenario/
http://universes-in-universe.org/eng/bien/venice_biennale/2011/tour/latin_america
http://universes-in-universe.org/eng/bien/venice_biennale/2013/tour/latin_america
https://www.faz.net/frankfurter-allgemeine-zeitung/feuilleton/die-vermessung-der-unabhaengigkeit-1653790.html
http://universes-in-universe.org/eng/bien/montevideo_biennial/2012
http://www.nzz.ch/aktuell/feuilleton/uebersicht/flinke-messer-und-schwere-duefte-1.18044261
http://universes-in-universe.org/eng/bien/montevideo_biennial/2014
http://universes-in-universe.org/deu/bien/biennale_venedig/2015/tour/latin_america

1950 births
People from Biberach (district)
Living people
German curators
German art critics